Tortriculladia eucosmella is a moth in the family Crambidae. It was described by Harrison Gray Dyar Jr. in 1914. It is found in Panama and Suriname.

References

Crambini
Moths described in 1914
Moths of Central America
Moths of South America